In mathematics, a submodular set function (also known as a submodular function) is a set function whose value, informally, has the property that the difference in the incremental value of the function that a single element makes when added to an input set decreases as the size of the input set increases. Submodular functions have a natural diminishing returns property which makes them suitable for many applications, including approximation algorithms, game theory (as functions modeling user preferences) and electrical networks. Recently, submodular functions have also found immense utility in several real world problems in machine learning and artificial intelligence, including automatic summarization, multi-document summarization, feature selection, active learning, sensor placement, image collection summarization and many other domains.

Definition 
 For every  we have that .
 For every  and  such that  we have that .

A nonnegative submodular function is also a subadditive function, but a subadditive function need not be submodular.
If  is not assumed finite, then the above conditions are not equivalent.  In particular a function 
 defined by  if  is finite and  if  is infinite 

Types and examples of submodular functions

Monotone 
A set function  is monotone if for every  we have that . Examples of monotone submodular functions include:
 Linear (Modular) functions  Any function of the form  is called a linear function. Additionally if  then f is monotone.
 Coverage functions  Let  be a collection of subsets of some ground set . This can be generalized by adding non-negative weights to the elements.
 Entropy  Let  be a set of random variables. Then for any  we have that  is a submodular function, where  is the entropy of the set of random variables , a fact known as Shannon's inequality. Further inequalities for the entropy function are known to hold, see entropic vector.
 Matroid rank functions  Let  be the ground set on which a matroid is defined. Then the rank function of the matroid is a submodular function.

Non-monotone 
A submodular function that is not monotone is called non-monotone.

Symmetric 
A non-monotone submodular function  is called symmetric if for every  we have that .
Examples of symmetric non-monotone submodular functions include:
 Graph cuts  Let  be the vertices of a graph. This can be generalized by adding non-negative weights to the edges.
 Mutual information  Let  be a set of random variables. Then for any  we have that  is a submodular function, where  is the mutual information.

Asymmetric 
A non-monotone submodular function which is not symmetric is called asymmetric.
 Directed cuts  Let  be the vertices of a directed graph. This can be generalized by adding non-negative weights to the directed edges.

Continuous extensions

Definition 

In the context of submodular functions, there are a few examples of continuous extensions that are commonly used, which are described as follows.

Examples

Lovász extension 
This extension is named after mathematician László Lovász. Consider any vector  such that each . Then the Lovász extension is defined as  where the expectation is over  chosen from the uniform distribution on the interval . The Lovász extension is a convex function if and only if  is a submodular function.

Multilinear extension 
Consider any vector  such that each .

Convex closure 
Consider any vector  such that each .

Concave closure 
Consider any vector  such that each .

Connections between extensions 
For the extensions discussed above, it can be shown that  when  is submodular.

Properties 
 The class of submodular functions is closed under non-negative linear combinations. Consider any submodular function  and non-negative numbers .
The function , where  is a real number, is submodular whenever  is monotone submodular. More generally,  is submodular, for any non decreasing concave function . 
 Consider a random process where a set  is chosen with each element in  being included in  independently with probability . Then the following inequality is true  where  is the empty set. More generally consider the following random process where a set  is constructed as follows. For each of  construct  by including each element in  independently into  with probability . Furthermore let . Then the following inequality is true .

Optimization problems 
Submodular functions have properties which are very similar to convex and concave functions. For this reason, an optimization problem which concerns optimizing a convex or concave function can also be described as the problem of maximizing or minimizing a submodular function subject to some constraints.

Submodular set function minimization
The hardness of minimizing a submodular set function depends on constraints imposed on the problem. 

 The unconstrained problem of minimizing a submodular function is computable in polynomial time, and even in strongly-polynomial time. Computing the minimum cut in a graph is a special case of this minimization problem.
 The problem of minimizing a submodular function with a cardinality lower bound is NP-hard, with polynomial factor lower bounds on the approximation factor.

Submodular set function maximization
Unlike the case of minimization, maximizing a generic submodular function is NP-hard even in the unconstrained setting. Thus, most of the works in this field are concerned with polynomial-time approximation algorithms, including greedy algorithms or local search algorithms.

 The problem of maximizing a non-negative submodular function admits a 1/2 approximation algorithm. Computing the maximum cut of a graph is a special case of this problem.
 The problem of maximizing a monotone submodular function subject to a cardinality constraint admits a  approximation algorithm. The maximum coverage problem is a special case of this problem. 
 The problem of maximizing a monotone submodular function subject to a matroid constraint (which subsumes the case above) also admits a  approximation algorithm.

Many of these algorithms can be unified within a semi-differential based framework of algorithms.

Related optimization problems
Apart from submodular minimization and maximization, there are several other natural optimization problems related to submodular functions.

 Minimizing the difference between two submodular functions is not only NP hard, but also inapproximable. 
 Minimization/maximization of a submodular function subject to a submodular level set constraint (also known as submodular optimization subject to submodular cover or submodular knapsack constraint) admits bounded approximation guarantees.
 Partitioning data based on a submodular function to maximize the average welfare is known as the submodular welfare problem, which also admits bounded approximation guarantees (see welfare maximization).

Applications 
Submodular functions naturally occur in several real world applications, in economics, game theory, machine learning and computer vision. Owing to the diminishing returns property, submodular functions naturally model costs of items, since there is often a larger discount, with an increase in the items one buys. Submodular functions model notions of complexity, similarity and cooperation when they appear in minimization problems. In maximization problems, on the other hand, they model notions of diversity, information and coverage.

See also 
 Supermodular function
 Matroid, Polymatroid
 Utility functions on indivisible goods

Citations

References

External links
 http://www.cs.berkeley.edu/~stefje/references.html has a longer bibliography
 http://submodularity.org/ includes further material on the subject

 
 
Matroid theory